Avery Fischer Udagawa is a translator of children's books from Japanese.

Biography 
Udagawa grew up in Kansas and studied English and Asian Studies at St. Olaf College in Minnesota. She studied at Nanzan University, Nagoya, on a Fulbright Fellowship, and at the Inter-University Center for Japanese Language Studies, Yokohama, later earning an MA in Advanced Japanese Studies from The University of Sheffield. She writes, translates, and works in international education near Bangkok. She is a campaigner for literary translation, and literary translators, especially with the Society of Children's Book Writers and Illustrators.

Awards and honors 
 2022 Winner, Mildred L. Batchelder Award for her translation of Sachiko Kashiwaba's Temple Alley Summer, illus. Miho Satake.
 2002 Winner, Audie Award for Middle Grade Title for her translation of Sachiko Kashiwaba's Temple Alley Summer, narrated by Traci Kato-Kiriyama

Translations 
 Temple Alley Summer, by Sachiko Kashiwaba, ills. Miho Satake (Restless Books, 2021)
 J-Boys: Kazuo’s World, by Shogo Oketani (IBC Publishing, 2013; Stone Bridge Press, 2011)
 "Festival Time" by Ippei Mogami, in The Best Asian Short Stories 2018, illus. Saburo Takada (Kitaab, 2018)
 "Swing" by Ippei Mogami, in Kyoto Journal 82, May 2015
 "Mirror, Mirror", by Sachiko Kashiwaba, in A Tapestry of Colours 1: Stories from Asia (Marshall Cavendish Editions, 2021)
 "House of Trust", by Sachiko Kashiwaba, in Tomo: Friendship Through Fiction—An Anthology of Japan Teen Stories (Stone Bridge Press, 2012) https://play.google.com/store/books/details?id=b9vODwAAQBAJ
 "First Claw", by Sachiko Kashiwaba, in Words Without Borders, April 2020
 My Japan, by Etsuko Filliquet (Kaiseisha, 2017)
 Baby Chick, by Jun’ichi Kobayashi, ullus. Eigoro Futamata (original work by Kornei I. Chukovskii), (Doshinsha, 2009) - co-translated with Etsuko Nozaka
 "Inside" by Rio Shimamoto, in Inside and Other Short Fiction: Japanese Women by Japanese Women (Kodansha International, 2006)
 "The Shadow of the Orchid" by Nobuko Takagi, in Inside and Other Short Fiction: Japanese Women by Japanese Women (Kodansha International, 2006)

References

External links 
 Avery Fischer Udagawa - website
 Avery Fischer Udagawa on Words Without Borders
 Avery Fischer Udagawa on Global Literature in Libraries Initiative
 Avery Fischer Udagawa on Society of Children's Books Writers and Illustrators

See also 
 List of translators of children's books

Year of birth missing (living people)
Living people
Literary translators
American translators
21st-century American women
Japanese–English translators